Mambetov (masculine) or Mambetova (feminine) is a Russian surname. Notable people with the surname include:

Arsen Mambetov (born 1982), Russian footballer
Asset Mambetov (born 1982), Kazakh sport wrestler
Evelina Mambetova (born 1991), Ukrainian model

Russian-language surnames